Consenting Adults is an album by MTB, a quintet consisting of Brad Mehldau (piano), Mark Turner (tenor sax), Peter Bernstein (guitar), Larry Grenadier (bass), and Leon Parker (drums).

Music and recording
The album was recorded in New York City on December 26, 1994. The first track, "Belief", "starts out with some Charleston off beats before leading into a Messengers-type shuffle."

The album was released in 2000. Mehldau commented that "it captured all of us when we were right at the beginning of developing our own voices." All members of the quintet went on to be successful jazz musicians.

Track listing
"Belief" (Leon Parker) – 6:50
"Little Melonae I" (Jackie McLean) – 7:15
"Phantasm" (Peter Bernstein) – 9:39
"Afterglow" (Bernstein) – 5:49
"Limbo" (Wayne Shorter) – 7:28
"Consenting Adults" (Brad Mehldau) – 9:07
"From This Moment On" (Cole Porter) – 6:09
"Peace" (Horace Silver) – 5:59
"Little Melonae II" (McLean) – 6:43

Personnel
 Brad Mehldau – piano
 Mark Turner – tenor sax
 Peter Bernstein – guitar
 Larry Grenadier – bass
 Leon Parker – drums

References

 

Brad Mehldau albums
Criss Cross Jazz albums
Peter Bernstein albums
2000 albums